The Oak Ridge Boys are an American musical group. Originally a gospel quartet, The Oak Ridge Boys switched their focus to secular country music in the mid-1970s, releasing a string of hit albums and singles that lasted into the early 1990s. Their discography comprises thirty-one studio albums and fifty-six singles. Their highest-selling album is 1981's Fancy Free, which is certified double-platinum by the Recording Industry Association of America (RIAA).

Of The Oak Ridge Boys' singles, seventeen reached Number One on the Billboard country singles charts. Two of these songs, "Elvira" and "Bobbie Sue", were also Top 40 pop and Adult Contemporary hits, and the former is certified platinum as a single. Four additional singles ("Sail Away", "Dream On", "Heart of Mine", and "Fancy Free") also entered the AC charts, while "So Fine" and "American Made" both made the 70s on the pop charts.

Studio albums

1950s and 1960s

1970s

1980s

1990s

2000s

2010s and 2020s

Compilation albums

Holiday albums

Live albums

Singles

1970s

1980s

1990s

2000s and 2010s

Other singles

Christmas singles

Featured singles

Promotional singles

Music videos

References

Country music discographies
Discographies of American artists